= Spinodiadelia =

Scientific classification
- Kingdom: Animalia
- Phylum: Arthropoda
- Class: Insecta
- Order: Coleoptera
- Suborder: Polyphaga
- Infraorder: Cucujiformia
- Family: Cerambycidae
- Genus: Spinodiadelia
- Species: S. spinipennis

Binomial name
- Spinodiadelia spinipennis Breuning, 1960

Genus of beetles

Spinodiadelia spinipennis is a species of beetle in the family Cerambycidae, and the only species in the genus Spinodiadelia. It was described by Breuning in 1960.
